The District of Columbia Board of Elections (BOE) is the independent agency of the District government responsible for the administration of elections, ballot access and voter registration. The BOE consists of three active board members, an executive director, a general counsel and a number of support staff who run the day-to-day operations of the agency.

Within the BOE is the Office of Campaign Finance which enforces DC laws related to campaign finance, lobbying and conduct of public officials.

The agency was named the District of Columbia Board of Elections & Ethics (BOEE) until July 2012, when it was renamed the District of Columbia Board of Elections. The district's ethics law established a new Board of Ethics and Government Accountability that would handle the ethical matters that were formerly handled by the Board of Elections & Ethics.

References

External links
District of Columbia Board of Elections.
District of Columbia Board of Elections voter information site.

Government in Washington, D.C.